Rock Paintings of Shuimogou are images carved into the rocks of Shuimogou, Alxa Left Banner, Inner Mongolia. This petroglyph site was first discovered in March 2020,  providing important materials and basis for further revealing the origin and evolution of Chinese rock paintings.

Named
These petroglyphss were found about 15 kilometers northeast of Bayanhaote Town (巴彦浩特镇) and were named "Rock Paintings of Shuimogou" because they are near Shuimogou (水磨沟) in Helan Mountains.

Creation periods
Shuimogou Petroglyphs were created from the Late Stone Age to the Iron Age and coexist with stone walls, stone enclosures and burial remains of different eras.

References

Petroglyphs
Rock art in China
Buildings and structures in Alxa League